Edsberg may refer to:
 Edsberg, district in the municipality of Sollentuna, Sweden
 Edsberg Hundred, hundred divided between Närke and Värmland in Sweden